The economy of Brazil has been characterized by instability, and exceptionally unstable periods have affected a number of Brazilian states before and after the country's independence in 1822.

Before independence

After independence

See also 
 Timeline of Brazilian economic stabilization plans
 Economic history of Brazil

References 

Economic crises in Brazil
Brazil economy-related lists